Charles Roberts Breyer (born November 3, 1941) is an American attorney and jurist serving as a senior United States district judge of the United States District Court for the Northern District of California. Breyer served as chairman of the United States Sentencing Commission from 2018 to 2022.

Early life and career

Breyer was born in San Francisco, California. He is the younger brother of Stephen Breyer, who served as a justice of the U.S. Supreme Court from 1994 to 2022. Breyer and his older brother Stephen were active in the Boy Scouts of America and achieved the Eagle Scout rank.

Breyer attended Lowell High School. He received a Bachelor of Arts degree from Harvard College in 1963 and a Juris Doctor from the University of California, Berkeley in 1966. He was a law clerk to Judge Oliver Carter of the United States District Court for the Northern District of California from 1966 to 1967. He was a Counsel, Legal Aid Society of San Francisco in 1967, and was then an assistant district attorney for the City & County of San Francisco, California, from 1967 to 1973.

Breyer was an assistant special prosecutor on the Watergate Special Prosecution Force from 1973 to 1974, and then entered private practice in San Francisco from 1974 to 1997, interrupted by a brief stint as chief assistant district attorney of the City and County of San Francisco in 1979.

Federal judicial service
On July 24, 1997, Breyer was nominated by President Bill Clinton to a seat on the United States District Court for the Northern District of California vacated by D. Lowell Jensen. He was confirmed by the United States Senate on November 8, 1997, and received his commission on November 12, 1997. He took senior status on December 31, 2011. He served as a Member of the United States Judicial Conference from 2006 to 2010. He has served as a Member of the United States Judicial Panel on Multidistrict Litigation since 2011. He served as Vice Chair of the United States Sentencing Commission from 2013 to 2016 and as a Member of the same commission since 2017.

Justice Breyer has recused himself from appeals of cases tried by his brother, including Olympic Airways v. Husain, Department of Housing and Urban Development v. Rucker, United States v. Oakland Cannabis Buyers’ Cooperative, Monsanto Co. v. Geertson Seed Farms, Amgen, Inc. v. Connecticut Retirement Plans and Trust Funds and City and County of San Francisco v. Sheehan.

Notable cases

Breyer presided over the Ed Rosenthal trial in 2007, in Rosenthal's federal prosecution for distribution of marijuana for medical use. This case was controversial because Breyer sentenced Rosenthal, who faced a possible sentence of one hundred years for growing marijuana, to just one day in prison. He also presided over the stock-options backdating trial of Brocade Communications Systems CEO Gregory Reyes in 2007.

In 2014, he ruled against the City of San Francisco's legislation to protect tenants from Ellis Act evictions. He presided over the 2014 criminal case involving San Francisco police theft and racist texting, in which his court order was blamed for the delay in releasing information.

Following the Volkswagen emissions scandal, Breyer had approved $16.5 billion settlement for US consumers. Volkswagen agreed to redeem an estimated of 475,000 polluting 2.0 diesel automobiles in the US.

Personal life
Breyer was married to the late Sydney Goldstein, who founded City Arts & Lectures in San Francisco in 1980 and for whom the Nourse Theater was renamed in her honor after her death in 2018.

See also
 List of Jewish American jurists

References

External links

1941 births
20th-century American judges
21st-century American judges
20th-century American Jews
21st-century American Jews
Harvard College alumni
Jewish American attorneys
Judges of the United States District Court for the Northern District of California
Living people
Members of the United States Sentencing Commission
People from San Francisco
UC Berkeley School of Law alumni
United States district court judges appointed by Bill Clinton